Sergey Aleksandrovich Makarov (born March 19, 1973) is a retired Russian track and field athlete who competed in the javelin throw. His personal best throw of 92.61 m, set in 2002, is the Russian record. Facing tough competition throughout his career from Jan Železný, Steve Backley and others, Makarov did not win any major competition until 2003, when he became World Champion at the age of 30.

Born into a sporting family, Makarov's father, Aleksandr, won the silver medal in the javelin throw at the 1980 Summer Olympics.

He is married to Oksana Ovchinnikova, former holder of the Russian record in women's javelin.

International competitions

Seasonal bests by year
1991 - 73.48
1992 - 76.08
1993 - 75.78
1994 - 82.54
1995 - 84.42
1996 - 88.86
1997 - 88.54
1998 - 86.96
1999 - 89.93
2000 - 89.92
2001 - 88.42
2002 - 92.61
2003 - 90.11
2004 - 86.19
2005 - 90.33
2006 - 88.49
2007 - 87.46
2008 - 86.88
2009 - 84.24
2010 - 83.59
2011 - 87.12
2012 - 83.39

References

1973 births
Living people
Russian male javelin throwers
Russian athletics coaches
Olympic athletes of Russia
Olympic bronze medalists for Russia
Olympic bronze medalists in athletics (track and field)
Athletes (track and field) at the 1996 Summer Olympics
Athletes (track and field) at the 2000 Summer Olympics
Athletes (track and field) at the 2004 Summer Olympics
Athletes (track and field) at the 2008 Summer Olympics
Medalists at the 2000 Summer Olympics
Medalists at the 2004 Summer Olympics
Goodwill Games medalists in athletics
Competitors at the 1998 Goodwill Games
World Athletics Championships athletes for Russia
World Athletics Championships medalists
World Athletics Championships winners
IAAF Continental Cup winners
European Athletics Championships medalists
Russian Athletics Championships winners
People from Podolsk
Sportspeople from Moscow Oblast